Al lupo al lupo (Wolf! Wolf!) is a 1992 Italian comedy film directed by Carlo Verdone. The film won two Nastro d'Argento awards, for best script and best score.

Plot 
Gregorio, his brother Vanni and their sister Livia have progressively lost contact with each others. Vanni and Livia have found success in their artistic career, along the footsteps of their father, a famous sculptor. Gregorio instead seems to lead a more borderline life, as a DJ, party organizer, and counter-culture musician of limited following.

The sudden disappearance of their father brings them back together, as they try to figure out what may have happened, and to locate the old man. In their search for clues, they revisit some of the places where they had spent their childhood together. Along this path in their memories and the related attempts to figure out the few hints left by their father, they discover that they share in their adulthood more than they had thought.

Cast 
Carlo Verdone: Gregorio Sagonà
Francesca Neri: Livia Sagonà
Sergio Rubini: Vanni Sagonà
Barry Morse: Mario Sagonà
: Paolo
Cecilia Luci: Vanessa
Alberto Marozzi: Ivano
Fabio Corrado: Gregorio Sagonà as a child
Gillian McCutcheon: Diamante
Loris Palusco: Rodolfo
Giulia Verdone: Livia Sagonà as a child
Stefano De Angelis: Vanni Sagonà as a child
: Corrado Santor
Maria Mercader: elderly lady

References

External links

1992 films
Italian comedy films
Films directed by Carlo Verdone
1992 comedy films
1990s Italian-language films
1990s Italian films